Helminger is a surname. Notable people with the surname include:

Guy Helminger (born 1963), Luxembourgian writer, brother of Nico
Nico Helminger (born 1953), Luxembourgian writer
Paul Helminger (1940–2021), Luxembourgian politician

See also
Hellinger